The Queen's Own Yorkshire Yeomanry was a Yeomanry regiment of the British Army from 1956 to 1971. Its lineage is maintained by the Yorkshire Yeomanry Squadron, the Queen's Own Yeomanry.

History
The regiment was formed by the amalgamation of three Yorkshire Yeomanry regiments, the Yorkshire Hussars, the Queen's Own Yorkshire Dragoons and the East Riding of Yorkshire Yeomanry in 1956. The regiment was equipped with Daimler Dingo armoured cars and Austin Champs, and later Ferrets and Land Rovers. In 1967, it was disbanded and immediately reconstituted as the Queen's Own Yorkshire Yeomanry (T), a TAVR III (Home Defence) infantry unit of the Territorial Army. It was reduced to a cadre in 1969, and became the Yorkshire Squadron, the Queen's Own Yeomanry in 1971.

During the 1970s the Yorkshire Squadron was equipped with Saladins, Saracens and Ferrets, later to be replaced by the Combat Vehicle Reconnaissance (Wheeled) and Combat Vehicle Reconnaissance (Tracked) series of vehicles and trained to provide rear area security for I British Corps. It now uses the Land Rover RWMIK and operates in a light armoured reconnaissance role.

References

Yeomanry regiments of the British Army
Military history of Yorkshire
Regiments of Yorkshire